The Reformed Old Apostolic Church is a chiliastic denomination with roots in the Catholic Apostolic Church and the Old Apostolic Church. It is part of a branch in Christianity called Irvingism with membership  throughout South Africa.

History

The Reformed Old Apostolic Church was founded in 1972 by Robert Lombard, a former Helper Apostle of the Old Apostolic Church of Africa.

Pre-ROAC History

Robert Lombard was ordained as an Apostle in the Old Apostolic Church in 1958 by Apostle William Campbell, to assist in the coloured congregations of the Cape church. Lombard was the first coloured, and the second non-white Helper Apostle of the Old Apostolic Church.

References

Churches in South Africa
Catholic Apostolic Church denominations
Christian organizations established in 1972
1972 establishments in South Africa